ABS-CBN Center for Communication Arts, Inc., doing business as Star Magic (formerly known as ABS-CBN Talent Center), is the talent agency owned by ABS-CBN Corporation based in Quezon City, Metro Manila, Philippines that was founded in 1992.

History
In April 1992, Freddie M. Garcia, then ABS-CBN executive vice president and general manager, and Johnny Manahan, then program director, formed the idea of creating a stable of new stars exclusively for the network. Star Magic was created on May 12, 1992 to assist young talent in the Philippines, where its talents undergo training in acting, personality development and physical enhancement before joining in the Philippine television and film industry such as the television shows of ABS-CBN and Star Cinema films, commercial projects, and corporate events.

On June 26, 2011, the company celebrated its 19th anniversary on ASAP Rocks. It also launched the new website and the new music video with the current artists of the company.

In 2019, Star Magic hosted a Mobile Legends: Bang Bang event with 4 teams of celebrities.

In 2020, following the expiration and subsequent denial of ABS-CBN's franchise, Manahan and Mariole Alberto stepped down, with Manahan moving to Brightlight Productions and later to GMA Artist Center. Laurenti Dyogi was named the new head which took effect on January 1, 2021.

In 2021, Star Magic announced during its Black Pen Day Signing that they will be launching Star Magic Records, a sub label under ABS-CBN Music; Star Magic Studio, which will create content for Star Magic artists; and Star Magic Digital Artist Agency, as well as relaunching ABS-CBN's theatre arm Teatro Kapamilya.

In August 2022, certain Star Magic artists toured the United States as part of their 30th anniversary celebration, staging shows in Kings Theater, Brooklyn, The Warfield, San Francisco, and in the Saban Theatre, Beverly Hills. Prior to the US tour, the artists (except singer-songwriter SAB) staged a kick-off event at the Newport Performing Arts Theater in Resorts World Manila.

See also
Sparkle
Rise Artists Studio

References

External links

 

 
1992 establishments in the Philippines
Talent agencies of the Philippines
Assets owned by ABS-CBN Corporation